Patrick Asselman (born 30 October 1968) is a Belgian former football player and currently assistant coach of Anderlecht in the Belgian Pro League.

Honours
Standard Liège
 Belgian Cup: 1992–93

References

External links

1968 births
Living people
People from Schaerbeek
Belgian footballers
Belgian football managers
Belgian Pro League players
Challenger Pro League players
Belgian expatriate footballers
Expatriate footballers in Portugal
Belgian expatriate sportspeople in Portugal
K.R.C. Mechelen players
Standard Liège players
K.V. Mechelen players
Vitória S.C. players
C.S. Marítimo players
K.R.C. Mechelen managers
F.C.V. Dender E.H. managers
Oud-Heverlee Leuven non-playing staff
Association football midfielders
Footballers from Brussels